Voshchazhnikovo is a rural locality (a village) in Myaksinskoye Rural Settlement, Cherepovetsky District, Vologda Oblast, Russia. The population was 21 as of 2002.

Geography 
Voshchazhnikovo is located 38 km southeast of Cherepovets (the district's administrative centre) by road. Grigorevo is the nearest rural locality.

References 

Rural localities in Cherepovetsky District